Sultanhanı District is a district of Aksaray Province of Turkey. Its seat is the town Sultanhanı. Its area is 463 km2, and its population is 11,630 (2021). The district was established in 2017.

Composition
There is one municipality in Sultanhanı District:
 Sultanhanı

There is one village in Sultanhanı District:
 Yeşiltömek

References

Districts of Aksaray Province